Gp or GP may refer to:

Arts, entertainment, and media

Gaming
 Gameplanet (New Zealand), a New Zealand video game community
 GamePolitics.com, a blog about the politics of computer and video games
 GamePro, a monthly video game magazine
 Gold Piece, the currency unit in many role-playing games
 Mario Kart Arcade GP, a 2005 arcade game

Music
 GP (album), the first solo album by Gram Parsons
 General Public, a UK band of the 1980s and 1990s
 a stave annotation denoting a Rest for the entire orchestra
 Government Plates, 2013 studio album by hip-hop band, Death Grips
 "On GP", a song on The Powers That B by hip-hop band, Death Grips 
 General principle, a term used in hip hop

Other uses in music 
 GP Records (Indonesian record label), an Indonesian record label

Other media
 GP, a rating for films in the early 1970s, eventually changed to "PG" by the MPAA
 G.P., an Australian television medical drama series
 Göteborgs-Posten, a daily Swedish newspaper

In business and finance

Terminology
 General Partner, one with equal responsibility and liability for an enterprise
 Gross profit, an accounting term
 General practice, a term used in construction surveying

Businesses and brands 
 Model GP, for General Purpose tractor, built by Deere & Company
 Georgia-Pacific LLC, a manufacturer, and marketer of tissue, packaging, paper, pulp, and building products
 Girard-Perregaux, a luxury brand of Swiss watches
 Gold Peak, a manufacturer of batteries and portable solar chargers
 Google+, a social media service by Google
 Grameenphone, a telecommunications service provider in Bangladesh
 Jeep, an automobile marque

Mathematics, science, and technology

Biology, biochemistry, and medicine
 GP (journal), a journal now known as American Family Physician
 Gastroparesis, a medical condition
 General practitioner, in medicine, a doctor who treats acute and chronic illnesses and provides preventive care and health education to patients
 Glans penis, the sensitive bulbous structure at the distal end of the penis
 Globus pallidus, a subcortical structure of the brain
 Glycerate 3-phosphate, a 3-carbon molecule
 Glycoprotein, proteins that contain oligosaccharide chains (glycans) covalently attached to polypeptide side-chains
 Gutta-percha, used in endodontic treatment to obturate root canals
 Glecaprevir/pibrentasvir, medication used to treat hepatitis C

Computing 
 .gp, the Internet top-level domain for Guadeloupe
 Genetic programming, an algorithmic technique in computer science
 Geometric programming, an algorithmic technique in engineering and optimization
 Gigapixel image, a unit of computer graphic resolution
 Goal programming, a branch of multiple objective programming
 Grandparent post, a reference to the message two levels up in a threaded message board
 Guitar Pro, a music composing program
 Gurupa, Amazon.com's content delivery infrastructure
 Microsoft Dynamics GP, part of Microsoft Dynamics accounting software Great Plains
 PARI/GP, a computer algebra system

Weapons
 GP-25 or GP-30, two series of Russian under-barrel grenade launchers
 Grande Puissance (French for "High Power"), original Belgian name for the Browning Hi-Power
 L98A1 Cadet GP rifle

Other uses in maths, science, and technology
 Gaussian process, a stochastic process associated with the Gaussian probability distribution
 Geometric progression, a sequence of numbers in mathematics
 Poorly graded gravels, in the Unified Soil Classification System
 Ground plane, in electrical engineering
 Guide Point, on Ordnance Survey maps

Places

United States
 Grand Prairie, Texas
 Grants Pass, Oregon
 Grosse Pointe, Michigan
 Graden points, Brisbane

Elsewhere
 Garrison of Porsanger, a military garrison in Finnmark, Norway
 Gauteng, a province in South Africa
 Göppingen, a city in Germany (license plate prefix)
 Grande Prairie, a city in Alberta, Canada
 Guadeloupe, a French island in the Caribbean (by international country code)

Politics
 Civic Platform (Građanska platforma), a political organization in Serbia
 Green party, a formally organized political party based on the principles of Green politics
 Young Party (Genç Parti), a Turkish political party

Sport 
 Games played, in sports statistics
 Gary Payton (born 1968), nine-time NBA All-Star point guard, nicknamed "The Glove"
 GlobalPort Batang Pier, a team in the Philippine Basketball Association
 Grand Prix (disambiguation), French for "Grand Prize", used in several sports
 Guinness Premiership, an English rugby competition
 Gianpiero Lambiase, often known as GP, a British race engineer in Formula 1

Other uses 
 Garden-path sentence, a linguistic concept
 Great Pyrenees, a dog breed used as livestock guardians
 General Paper, a GCE 'A' Level examination subject in Singapore

See also 

 PG (disambiguation)
 Jeep (disambiguation)
 General-purpose (disambiguation)